Laura Ferrara (born 11 September 1983, Naples) is an Italian politician, elected for the first elected as a member of the European Parliament in 2014 and re-confirmed on 2019.

References

1983 births
Living people
MEPs for Italy 2014–2019
MEPs for Italy 2019–2024
21st-century women MEPs for Italy
Five Star Movement MEPs
Politicians from Naples